Antignac is the name of the following communes in France:

 Antignac, Cantal, in the Cantal department
 Antignac, Haute-Garonne, in the Haute-Garonne department